Mordechai Rechtman (born 16 May 1926) is an Israeli bassoonist, conductor, educator and arranger.

Biography
Mordechai Rechtman was born in Wuppertal, Germany. He immigrated to Palestine with  his parents in 1934.

In 1948, as a bassoonist with an ensemble of the Israel Philharmonic Orchestra, he played Hatikva, the Israeli national anthem, at the signing ceremony of the Israeli Declaration of Independence.

Music and academic career
Rechtman began playing the bassoon at age 12 and began his professional career three years later, playing principal bassoon with the Palestine Opera, where he remained until 1945. He was awarded first prize at the 1947 Prague Festival, and from 1946 to 1991 he was principal bassoon with the Israel Philharmonic Orchestra. He was the only Israeli representative selected by Arthur Fiedler to join the World Symphony Orchestra which performed at the opening of Walt Disney World in October, 1971

Rechtman has appeared as soloist with the Israel Philharmonic Orchestra and other orchestras in Israel and abroad, and in music festivals, such as Tanglewood, Spoleto, Marlboro and the Pablo Casals Music Festival in Puerto Rico. He founded the Israel Woodwind Quintet in 1963 and the Philharmonic Woodwind Ensemble, of which he was music director and conductor, in 1976. Rechtman has conducted many of Israel's major orchestras, such as the Israel Philharmonic Orchestra, Jerusalem Symphony, Sinfonietta Beer-Shiva, Kibbutz Chamber Orchestra, Tel-Aviv Academy of Music Orchestra, Israel Camerata Orchestra Jerusalem and many other ensembles. In 1976, he was named head of the woodwinds in the orchestra by Music Director Zubin Mehta.

Rechtman has written transcriptions and arrangements for wind quintet, wind instruments and large wind ensembles. His talent as an arranger has been highly acclaimed, and his arrangements for wind ensembles (numbering more than 200 ) have been performed around the world, often under his own direction. Rechtman’s arrangements have been published by various publishers including Edition Wilhelm Hansen, Belwin Mills Publishing Corp, June Emerson Wind Music, Accolade Musicverlag and McGinnis and Marx. In 2014 he began arranging Late Classical and Romantic concerti for chamber ensembles, published under his own company, Rechtman Concerto Reductions. Mordechai Rechtman’s composition teachers included Ödön Pártos, Hanoch Jacoby, Moshe Lustig and Zeev Steinberg.

From 1985 to 1991, Rechtman served as the music director and conductor of the Israel Chamber Orchestra Wind Ensemble. A founding member of the Israel Woodwind Quintet, Mordechai Rechtman has recorded for several labels, including for Decca, Deutsche Grammophon, Koch International Sony Classics and Meridian Records

From 1977-78, Rechtman was a guest professor at Indiana University School of Music. In 1968-2002, he served as a professor of music at the Rubin Academy of Tel-Aviv University.  As a guest professor he taught bassoon, coached chamber music, and conducted large wind ensembles and orchestras at the New England Conservatory, The Juilliard School of Music, and the Royal Academy of Music, as well as other locations in Canada, Mexico, Australia and throughout Europe.

Chess career
He holds the IM (International Correspondence Chess Master) title of the International Correspondence Chess Federation.
Rechtman is an International Master in Correspondence Chess and still plays over the board chess in the Israeli league (May 2015). His best result is a 4:4 draw in a  Correspondence Chess match versus Samuel Reshevsky.

Awards and recognition
In August 1994, Rechtman was elected Honorary Membership of the International Double Reed Society. He won the 2004 award of the Board of Trustees of the Minister of Education, Culture and Sports Prize of Music Performances for his special contribution to music in Israel.

References

External links
 https://www.accolade.de/index.php?action=showresult&page=1&db=Datenbank%20Accolade%20Musikverlag&search=ST=MORDECHAI%20UND%20ST=RECHTMAN All my works are available at accolade.de via the link 
 Beethoven: Septet op. 20 1 st mvt, The New Israeli Quartet with Lesser, Delvescovo, Rechtman playing the bassoon
 "bassoon quartet"—Mordechai Rechtman arrangement for Bach Choral PreludE
 Ludwig van Beethoven - Quintett Es-Dur op.4 (bearb. Mordechai Rechtman) 4.Satz: Finale. Presto
 Mordechai Rechtman’s arrangement of the Mendelssohn E minor violin concerto
 Mordechai Rechtman's arrangement of Bruch violin concerto no. 1
 Rechtman wins a chess game versus Samuel Reshevsky
 Mordechai Rechtman Biography at Bach-Cantatas.com
 Mordechai Rechtman Biography at IDRS website
 Mordechai Rechtman Biography at Rechtman Concerto Reductions
 Mordechai Rechtman biography at Marquis Music website
 Mordechai Rechtman at AllMusic

1926 births
Living people
20th-century conductors (music)
21st-century conductors (music)
Jewish emigrants from Nazi Germany to Mandatory Palestine
Israeli conductors (music)
Israeli classical bassoonists